The team eventing in equestrian at the 1952 Olympic Games in Helsinki was held from 30 July to 2 August. Only 33 of the 57 starters were able to finish the competition, with 19 being disqualified in the cross-country, 3 more retiring during that phase, and 2 being disqualified in the jumping. This left only 6 of the 19 teams with all three riders finishing.

Competition format
The team and individual eventing competitions used the same scores. Eventing consisted of a dressage test, a cross-country test, and a jumping test. Team eventing final scores were the sum of the three individual scores for riders from the same nation; a team that did not have all three riders finish did not place.

 Dressage: The eventing competition featured a 12-minute dressage test. The maximum score was 400. Points could be lost for performance as well as time (0.5 points per second over the time limit). Competitors losing more than 200 points were disqualified.
 Cross-country: The cross-country test had five phases.
 Phase A: 7 km roads. Time allowed was 29 minutes, 10 seconds (240 m/min). Time penalties were 5 points per each 5 seconds or fraction thereof over the time limit.
 Phase B: 4 km steeplechase. Time allowed was 6 minutes, 40 seconds (600 m/min). Time penalties were 10 points per each 5 seconds or fraction thereof over the time limit. Time bonuses were 3 points per each 5 seconds or fraction thereof under the time limit (maximum 36 points gained). Obstacle faults were 20, 40, 60, or 80 points, or disqualification.
 Phase C: 15 km roads. Time allowed was 62 minutes, 30 seconds (240 m/min). Time penalties were 5 points per each 5 seconds or fraction thereof over the time limit.
 Phase D: 8 km cross-country. Time allowed was 17 minutes, 46 seconds (450 m/min). Time penalties were 10 points per each 5 seconds or fraction thereof over the time limit. Time bonuses were 3 points per each 5 seconds or fraction thereof under the time limit (maximum 72 points gained). Obstacle faults were 20, 40, 60, or 80 points, or disqualification. There were 34 obstacles.
 Phase E: 2 km flat. Time allowed was 6 minutes (333 m/min). Time penalties were 5 points per each 5 seconds or fraction thereof over the time limit.
 Jumping: The jumping test had 12 obstacles and was set to a speed of 400 m/min. Time penalties were 0.25 points per second or fraction of a second over the time limit. Fault penalties were 10, 20, or points, or disqualification.

Results

Standings after dressage

Standings after cross-country

Final standings after jumping

References

Sources
Organising Committee for the XV Olympiad, The (1952). The Official Report of the Organising Committee for the XV Olympiad, pp. 516–17, 522–24, 527. LA84 Foundation. Retrieved 22 October 2019.

Equestrian at the Summer Olympics